Beverly J. Silver (born 1957) is an American scholar of labor and development whose work has been translated into over twelve languages.  She is a professor of Sociology at The Johns Hopkins University in Baltimore, Maryland.

Training and academic career
Silver grew up in Detroit during a period of intense working-class struggle. She was active in the United Farm Workers Union and the solidarity campaigns for Chile.  Silver received her B.A. in economics from Barnard College and her Ph.D. from SUNY Binghamton, where she was part of the Fernand Braudel Center for the Study of Economies, Historical Systems, and Civilizations. During this time she collaborated with a number of scholars including Giovanni Arrighi, Immanuel Wallerstein, and Terence Hopkins and contributed to the development of the school of world-systems analysis. For many years she was a member of the World Labor Research Group at the Fernand Braudel Center at Binghamton.

Publications

Monographs
Silver, Beverly J.; Forces of Labor: Workers' Movements and Globalization since 1870 (2003), and since translated into Chinese, Korean, German, Polish, Portuguese, Italian and Spanish.
Silver, Beverly J. & Arrighi, Giovanni; Chaos and Governance in the Modern World-System (1999).
Silver, Beverly J., Arrighi, Giovanni and Dubofsky, Melvyn, editors; "Labor Unrest in the World-Economy, 1870-1990", special issue of Review (Fernand Braudel Center), vol. 18, no. 1, Winter, 1995, pages 1–206.

Journal articles and book chapters

Arrighi, Giovanni; Silver Beverly J. and Brewer, Benjamin D.; “Industrial Convergence and the Persistence of the North-South Income Divide: A Rejoinder”, Studies in Comparative International Development, vol. 40, no. 1, Spring 2005.
Arrighi, Giovanni; Silver, Beverly J. and Brewer, Benjamin D.; “Response”, Studies in Comparative International Development, 38, 1, Spring, 2003, 39-42
Arrighi, Giovanni; Silver, Beverly J. and Brewer, Benjamin D.; “Industrial Convergence, Globalization, and the Persistence of the North-South Divide”, Studies in Comparative International Development, 38, 1, Spring, 2003, 3-31
Arrighi Giovanni and Silver, Beverly J.; “Capitalism and World (Dis)Order”, Review of International Studies, 27, December, 2001, 961-983
Silver, Beverly J.; “Labor Upsurges: From Detroit to Ulsan and Beyond”, Critical Sociology, vol. 31, no. 3, pages 439-452, 2005.
Silver, Beverly J.; “Labor, Globalization and World Politics”, in Critical Globalization Studies, edited by Richard Appelbaum and William Robinson, Routledge Press, 2005
Silver, Beverly J.; “Labor, War and World Politics: Contemporary Dynamics in Historical Perspective”, in Labour and New Social Movements in a Globalizing World System, edited by Berthold Unfried, Marcel van der Linden and Christine Schindler (ITH, vol. 38), Akademische Verlagsanstalt, Leipzig, 2004
Silver, Beverly J.; “Rejoinder”, response to Symposium of Reviews of Beverly J. Silver’s "Forces of Labor: Workers’ Movements and Globalization Since 1870", in In Critical Solidarity (American Sociological Association), Winter 2003 Reprinted in Debate, (South Africa), Spring 2004
Silver, Beverly J.and Arrighi, Giovanni; “Polanyi’s ‘Double Movement’: The Belle Époques of U.S. and British World Hegemony Compared”, Politics and Society, June 2003
Silver, Beverly J. and Arrighi, Giovanni; “Workers North and South” in Leo Panitch and Colin Leys, editors, Socialist Register 2001 (Theme: Working Classes, Global Realities). London: Merlin Press, 2000, 51-74
 Silver, Beverly J. : “Arbeiterbewegung, Globalisierung und Weltpolitik: Dynamik der Gegenwart in welthistorischer Sicht", in: Jahrbuch für Forschungen zur Geschichte der Arbeiterbewegung, No. I/2004 (German Language).

Scholarly acclaim for Forces of Labor
Forces of Labor won the highest book award in 2005 from the American Sociological Association, the Distinguished Scholarly Publication Award.

References

External links

1957 births
Living people
American sociologists
Johns Hopkins University faculty
Writers from Detroit
Place of birth missing (living people)
Barnard College alumni
Binghamton University alumni
American women sociologists
21st-century American women